Year 318 (CCCXVIII) was a common year starting on Wednesday (link will display the full calendar) of the Julian calendar. At the time, it was known as the Year of the Consulship of Licinianus and Crispus (or, less frequently, year 1071 Ab urbe condita). The denomination 318 for this year has been used since the early medieval period, when the Anno Domini calendar era became the prevalent method in Europe for naming years.

Events 
 By place 

 Roman Empire 
 Emperor Constantine the Great gives the ancient Roman town Drepana (Asia Minor) the name Helenopolis, after his mother Helena, and builds a church in honour of the martyr St. Lucian.
 Constantine the Great is given the title Brittanicus Maximus, for successful engagements in Britain.

 Asia 
 The Chinese Empire loses its territories to the north of the Yangtze River, to the benefit of the Xiongnu and the Xianbei. The Former Zhao state is proclaimed; Liu Can and the state ruling family at Pingyang is executed in a coup d'état by Jin Zhun, who is in turn overthrown by Shi Le and Liu Yao.
 Liu Yao becomes the new emperor of Han Zhao and moves his capital to Chang'an.

 By topic 

 Religion 
 Gregory the Illuminator appoints his son Aristax as successor in the patriarchate of Armenia.

Births 
 Liu, Chinese empress and wife of Shi Hu (d. 349)

Deaths 
 February 7 – Min of Jin, Chinese emperor (b. 300)
 August 31 – Liu Cong, Chinese emperor
 Fan Changsheng, Chinese religious leader
 Jin Zhun, Chinese official and chancellor
 Liu Can (or Shiguang), Chinese emperor
 Liu Kun, Chinese general and poet (b. 270)
 Theodota of Philippi, Greek harlot and martyr

References